Simon Posford (born 28 October 1971), better known by his stage name Hallucinogen, is an English electronic musician, specializing in psychedelic trance music. His first studio album, Twisted, released in 1995, is considered one of the most influential albums in the genre. He has toured India several times. 

His second album, The Lone Deranger, was released in 1997. A third album consisting of Hallucinogen tracks remixed by the artist Ott, In Dub, was released in 2002.

He is also the founder of the label Twisted Records and works in the electronic groups Younger Brother and Shpongle. Younger Brother initially began as a side project of Posford and Benji Vaughan and represented a transition away from previous projects which emphasized a more synthesized style. 

His grandfather, George Posford, was a composer and producer in the United Kingdom in the 1930s.

Discography

Studio albums
 Twisted (1995)
 The Lone Deranger (1997)
 In Dub (2002) (Hallucinogen tracks remixed by Ott)
 In Dub - Live (2009)
 Flux & Contemplation - Portrait of an Artist in Isolation (2020) (as Simon Posford)

Singles/EPs
 Alpha Centauri / LSD (1994)
 LSD (Live Mix) (1995)
 Angelic Particles / Soothsayer (1995)
 Fluoro Neuro Sponge / Astral Pancakes (1995)
 LSD (1996)
 Deranger (1996)
 Space Pussy (1996)
 Mi-Loony-Um! (2000)
 LSD (Remixes) (2003)
 Pipeworm (2013) feat. Lucas O'Brien, Domestic, Loud

See also 
Shpongle
Younger Brother
The Infinity Project
Celtic Cross
Goa trance

References

External links 
 
 

1971 births
English electronic musicians
Living people
Goa trance musicians
Psychedelic trance musicians
People from Chobham, Surrey
Musicians from London
English session musicians
Downtempo musicians
Chill-out musicians
Younger Brother members
Psychedelic trance musical groups